Walter Röhrl (born 7 March 1947) is a German rally and auto racing driver, with victories for Fiat, Opel, Lancia and Audi as well as Porsche, Ford and BMW. Röhrl has scored 14 victories over his career, with his notable achievements including winning the World Rally Championship twice: in 1980 in a Fiat Abarth and in 1982 while driving for Opel. He has also competed in other forms of motorsport, such as endurance racing, winning in the GTP +3.0 class in the 24 Hours of Le Mans in 1981 with the Porsche System team. Röhrl also set the Pikes Peak International Hill Climb record in 1987 driving an Audi Sport Quattro S1 E2. He is often regarded as one of the greatest rally drivers of all time.

Career
Röhrl grew up as the youngest of three children of a stonemason in Regensburg, Bavaria, near Munich. His parents separated when he was ten years old. From then on he lived with his mother. After leaving school he completed a commercial education at Bishop's Ordinariate Regensburg. At the age of 16, Röhrl began working for the commercial director of a company that legally represented the Bishop of Regensburg along with six further Bishops in Bavaria, and skied in his spare time.  In time he became a qualified ski instructor and a keen driver, and became the chauffeur to the commercial director, covering up to 120,000 kilometres annually.  Some unqualified reports have stated he was once the Bishop's own driver, but this has been acknowledged as untrue.  Having also now been active in sports like skiing, Röhrl was invited to drive his first rally in 1968.

Röhrl was a World Rally Championship favourite throughout the 1970s and 1980s, winning the Monte Carlo Rally four times with four different marques. His co-driver for many years was Christian Geistdörfer. His Fiat 131 Abarth carried him to the 1980 title, clinched with his victory in that year's San Remo rally, but it was arguably his equivalent success in 1982 that impressed most of all, with Röhrl fending off audacious four-wheel drive opposition, led by Audi's resurgent Michèle Mouton, to take the title, by virtue of consistency, in his increasingly outmoded rear-drive Opel Ascona 400. It was also during this time that he won the African Rally Championship, in 1982. However, shortly after winning the championship he was fired from the team by team manager Tony Fall because he disliked competing in the RAC rally (the rally he had little success in). Röhrl had already had severe arguments with Tony Fall about publicity activities for the team sponsor, tobacco company Rothmans. Röhrl, as a strict nonsmoker, simply refused to do any filming for Rothmans publicity spots, claiming that he had been hired as a driver, not an actor, and that he could not see any sense in promoting tobacco as a nonsmoker anyway.

In 1983, he joined Lancia to pilot the new, rear-wheel drive Lancia 037, before finally changing his machinery, in 1984, to the four-wheel drive Audi Quattro, an automobile actually produced in his home state of Bavaria.

In 1987 Röhrl set up a new record in the Pikes Peak International Hill Climb for being the first driver to cover the 12.42 miles (19.99 km) long mountain track to the Pikes Peak in less than 11 minutes. In his 600 hp (440 kW) Audi Sport Quattro S1 E2 he did the famed American hillclimb in 10 minutes and 47.850 seconds to reach Pikes Peak on the road which at that time was mainly covered with gravel.

Despite being selective in his choice of top-level events (he declined to do the famed 1000 Lakes Rally in Finland due to his dislike of jumps and cars getting airborne), he did the RAC Rally in Britain only once more after 1979 and he only did the Swedish Rally twice, despite finishing third in 1982) albeit during a time when this was a less unusual occurrence for top-line drivers in the championship, Röhrl still scored 14 WRC victories in his career.

Röhrl was also successful in road racing events, and was called "Genius on Wheels" by Niki Lauda. In the 1992 24 Hours Nürburgring race which saw fog and heavy rain in the night, he hardly slowed down, anticipating the corners by timing. The race was nevertheless interrupted for hours.

In Italy, he was elected "Rallye driver of the century". In France he was elected "Rallye driver of the millennium" in November 2000. A jury out of 100 worldwide motorsports experts meeting in Italy elected him "Best Rallye driver ever".

In recent years, he has been retained as the senior test driver for Porsche road cars, famously setting quick laptimes for them testing round the famous Nürburgring Nordschleife, for example with the Porsche Carrera GT.

Röhrl was expected to make his competitive return to the Nürburgring 24 hour race in 2010 at the wheel of a Porsche 911 GT3 RS. However, he was forced to withdraw from the event due to a back injury. It was to be his first 24-hour race in 17 years, since his last start in 1993. In 2011, Röhrl was inducted into the Rally Hall of Fame along with Hannu Mikkola and in July 2016 was inducted into Germany's Sports Hall of Fame.

Complete WRC results

WRC victories

24 Hours of Le Mans results

References

External links

 Webpage from Walter Röhrl
 Walter Röhrl at rallybase.nl

1947 births
Living people
24 Hours of Le Mans drivers
Deutsche Tourenwagen Masters drivers
European Rally Championship drivers
German rally drivers
Sportspeople from Regensburg
Porsche Supercup drivers
Trans-Am Series drivers
World Rally Champions
World Rally Championship drivers
World Sportscar Championship drivers
Racing drivers from Bavaria
Porsche Motorsports drivers
Audi Sport drivers